The Matkus Shopping Center is a shopping mall in the southern part of Kuopio, Finland, located  south of its city center along the Highway 5 (E63), in the Matkus business area of the Hiltulanlahti district. It is the fifth largest business center in Finland. On bus lines 31 and 35 from the Kuopio Market Square directly to the shopping center.

The mall was opened on November 1, 2012. The shopping center have about 70-90 stores, and it belongs to the Ikano Group, which is owned by Ikea. The shops are positioned according to a concept, so all the sports stores, for example, will be together to make it easier for customers to find the things they are looking for. The fashion boutiques will be sited according to their target groups.

In the summer 2020, the Kuopio-themed Olopuisto outdoor activity park was completed, right next to the shopping center.

References

External links 
 Matkus Shopping Center - Official Site (in English)

Buildings and structures in Kuopio
Shopping centres in Finland
Shopping malls established in 2012